The Tompkins Avenue station was a station on the demolished BMT Lexington Avenue Line in Brooklyn, New York City. It had two tracks and two side platforms. It was located at the intersection of Lexington Avenue and Tompkins Avenue The station was opened on May 13, 1885, and had connections to the Tompkins Avenue Line, Marcy Avenue Line, and Ocean Avenue Line streetcars. It closed on October 13, 1950. The next southbound stop was Nostrand Avenue. The next northbound stop was Sumner Avenue.

References

External links

BMT Lexington Avenue Line stations
Railway stations in the United States opened in 1885
Railway stations closed in 1950
Former elevated and subway stations in Brooklyn